Banks is an unincorporated census-designated place in Boise County, Idaho, United States. Banks has a post office with ZIP code 83602. As of the 2010 census, its population was 17.

The North and South forks of the Payette River meet at Banks, which makes it a popular destination for people rafting or kayaking on the Payette River. The "Main" run of the Payette River begins at Banks, while the "Staircase" run on the South Fork ends at Banks.

History
Banks' population was 50 in 1960.

Demographics

Climate
This climatic region has large seasonal temperature differences, with warm to hot (and often humid) summers and cold (sometimes severely cold) winters.  According to the Köppen Climate Classification system, Banks has a humid continental climate, abbreviated "Dfb" on climate maps.

References

Census-designated places in Boise County, Idaho
Census-designated places in Idaho